Geri Hudson is a fictional character from the British Channel 4 soap opera Hollyoaks, played by Joanna Taylor. She first appeared in 1999 before leaving in 2001 after two years in the show.

Storylines
Geri arrived as a fresher at Hollyoaks Community College. Geri was a rich daughter of a biscuit factory owner and academia was never high on her list of priorities. She arrived in Hollyoaks determined to have as much fun as she possibly could. Geri moved into the halls with Sam Smallwood, Nikki Sullivan, Anna Green and Alex Bell, and soon formed a strong friendship with Anna that would last throughout her time in Hollyoaks. Geri hooked up with Rory Finnigan, but was dropped by him when he returned to Carol Groves. After much teasing, she finally got together with Adam Morgan. However, this relationship was also scuppered when Adam lost interest in her over new fresher Izzy Cornwell. Spurned by Adam, Geri formed a hatred for Izzy, which continued until just before she left Hollyoaks, when they finally reconciled their differences. A brief dalliance with Lewis Richardson followed, but this soon fizzled out and it seemed as if Geri would never meet the man of her dreams.

It was on holiday with her mother, the irrepressible Jacqui, which Geri met and fell for the football ace, Jason Cunliffe. What followed was a tumultuous relationship, as Geri had to cope with being the trophy and, at times, celebrity girlfriend and then, after Jason finally relented, she became celebrity fiancée. This relationship reached a climax in the video/DVD, 'Hollyoaks: Indecent Behaviour', when Geri saw Jason’s true colours as he was unfaithful to her and then turned a blind eye when his team-mate, Scott Anderson attempted to force himself on her. Geri was devastated that her fairytale prince had been exposed to be such a rogue. After much thought, she decided to go through with the wedding anyway and extract as much money as she could out of Jason, this was about revenge, not love. It was this plan that led Geri to leave. She married Jason and then, as they left for a new life in Spain, she threw him out of their limousine, informing him that their marriage was over and that she was going with her mother. As she left for the airport, Geri drove through Hollyoaks Village one last time and bid a tearful farewell.

Reception
A writer from Virgin Media profiled some of Hollyoaks' "hottest females" in their opinion, of Geri they stated: "Geri Hudson might've been one of the hottest honeys in the village but she still had her fair share of drama in the romance department. After marrying the ultimate bad boy footballer she eventually escaped with his cash to Spain. " Singer Lisa Scott-Lee said that she was just like Geri, a character who is "strong and independent and a bit feisty too". Allison Maund from Inside Soap branded Geri a bed-hopping female. Claire Tolley from the Liverpool Echo described Geri as "Hollyoaks biggest flirt and man-eater [who] spends the majority of her time in the soap getting one over on her love rivals."

References

Hollyoaks characters
Television characters introduced in 1999
Female characters in television